Dossi is an Italian surname. It may refer to:

Battista Dossi ( 1490–1548) – Italian painter, brother of Dosso Dossi
Carlo Dossi (1849–1910) – Italian writer
Dosso Dossi ( 1490–1542) – Italian painter, brother of Battista Dossi
Sofie Dossi (born 2001) – American contortionist
Tommaso Dossi (1678–1730) – Italian painter

It may also refer to a municipality in the province of Pavia:
Bastida de' Dossi

Surnames of South Tyrolean origin
Italian-language surnames